Limbo is a Norwegian drama film, written and directed by Maria Sødahl.

The movie takes place in the 1970s and depicts a so-called expatriate-group at Trinidad, associated with the oil industry.

External links

2010 films
Norwegian drama films
2010s Norwegian-language films
2010 drama films